MercBar was a bar and lounge located on Mercer Street in Soho.The bar was opened by John McDonald and architect Campion Platt in 1993. It was one of the first lounges of its kind and became a gathering place for the downtown art, fashion and entertainment world. The bar's original landlord was the Mercer Hotel, located next door.

History 
MercBar was opened in 1993 in an old garage and tile warehouse at 151 Mercer Street.  

The entrance to the bar was a graffiti-covered red door off to the side, the bar had no sign, and was meant to be hard to find and hard to access for many years.    

The bar closed in 2013 when the building was demolished.

References 

Music venues
Bartending
Defunct drinking establishments in Manhattan
Cultural history of New York City
1993 establishments in New York City
2013 disestablishments in New York (state)